Arshad Khan may refer to:

Arshad Khan (Indian cricketer) (born 1997)
Arshad Khan (Pakistani cricketer) (born 1971)
Arshad Khan (Canadian filmmaker), Pakistani-Canadian filmmaker
Arshad Ayub Khan (born 1967), Pakistani politician and businessman
Arshad Sami Khan (1942–2009), Pakistani diplomat, bureaucrat, and soldier

See also
Muhammad Arshad Khan (born 1969), Pakistani artist
Muhammad Arshad Khan Leghari, Pakistani politician, member of National Assembly since 2013
Abu Ahmed al-Kuwaiti (died 2011), also known as Arshad Khan, Pakistani al-Qaeda member and courier for Osama bin Laden